The 1938 National League Division Two was the inaugural season of British speedway's National League Division Two albeit a continuation of the Provincial League from the previous season in all but name.

The list of teams had several changes. Bristol Bulldogs had moved up to the National League and Hackney Wick Wolves had moved down to take their place. They also swapped licences and riders as well as divisions. Other new entrants were Lea Bridge Cubs, Newcastle, Sheffield and West Ham Hawks (West Ham's reserve team). Belle Vue Merseysiders who had replaced Liverpool in the previous season were also absent.

Nottingham withdrew just after the start of the league season and were replaced by Leeds Lions.

Hackney Wick Wolves won the title.

Final Table Division Two

Leading averages (league only)

Provincial Trophy
The 1938 Provincial Trophy was the third edition of the Trophy, which was won by Norwich Stars.

First round

Semifinals

Final

National Trophy
The 1938 National Trophy was the eighth edition of the Knockout Cup. Norwich Stars won the Division 2 Final round and therefore qualified for the quarter finals proper (the round when the tier one sides entered the competition).

First qualifying round

+ Nottingham withdrew from league replaced by Leeds resulting in Hackney's result becoming void.

Second qualifying round

Final

First leg

Second leg

Norwich were the National Trophy Div 2 winners, winning on aggregate 121-94.

See also
List of United Kingdom Speedway League Champions
Knockout Cup (speedway)

References

Speedway National League Division Two
1938 in British motorsport
1938 in speedway